Snakeville is a comedy short film series that was popular during the silent film era in the United States. It was produced by Essanay's Gilbert M. Anderson (Broncho Billy).

David Kirkland who went on to direct films portrayed Dr. Dopem in the series. Victor Potel was "Slippery Slim" in the Snakeville series. True Eames Boardman also appeared in the series. Emory Johnson was also in the series. Josephine Rector also appeared in the series.

Filmography
The Infant at Snakeville (1911), cast included Harry Todd
Snakeville's Fire Brigade (1914)
Snakeville's Home Guard (1914)
The Awakening at Snakeville (1914), cast includes Augustus Carney
When Snakeville Struck Oil (1915)
It Happened in Snakeville (1915)
Snakeville's Beauty Parlor (1915)
Versus Sledge Hammer (1915)

See also
Alkali Ike

References

American silent films
American film series